Emil Petrovici (1899–1968) was a Romanian linguist, dialectologist and Slavist. He studied both Romanian and Serbian languages. His studies included Romanian phonology, and Romanian, Serbian, and other Slavic dialectology.

Petrovici, of Serb descent, was born in the village of Torak (former Begejci), at the time part of Austria-Hungary, now in northern Serbia.

From 1949 to 1954, Petrovici worked on literary and cultural problems of Transylvania and collaborated on several journals published in Cluj. He died in the Bucerdea train collision in 1968.

Works

Among his many books were:
  (On nasalization in the Romanian language)
  (Language of Krashovani)
  (Folklore from the Almajului Valley, 1935)
  (Folklore of the Moţii of Scărişoara, 1939)
  (Notes on the folklore of the Romanians of the Mlava Valley, 1942)
  (Dialect Texts, Leipzig, 1943)
  (Romanian Linguistic Atlas), co-authored

External links

1899 births
1968 deaths
20th-century Serbian people
20th-century Romanian people
Rectors of Babeș-Bolyai University
Serbian people of Romanian descent
Romanian people of Serbian descent
Romanians of Vojvodina
Linguists from Romania
Linguists from Serbia
Slavists
Austro-Hungarian Serbs
People from the Kingdom of Hungary
People from Žitište
20th-century linguists